Hugh Robinson (1756–1796) was a British artist, best known for his history paintings and portraits.  His portrait of his sister's son, Thomas Teesdale as a young boy tugging on a kite string, entitled Boy with a Kite is considered "his masterpiece."

Notes

References

1756 births
1796 deaths
18th-century British painters
British male painters
History painters